Brittany N. Packnett Cunningham (born November 12, 1984) is an American activist and the co-founder of Campaign Zero.  She was a member of President Barack Obama's Task Force on 21st Century Policing. She was previously executive director for Teach for America in St. Louis, Missouri.

Early life and education 
Packnett Cunningham was born on November 12, 1984, to Rev Ronald Broadnox Packnett and his wife, Gwendolyn. She is the daughter of an ordained Baptist minister in St. Louis. She earned a Bachelor of Arts degree in African-American Studies at Washington University in St. Louis and a master's degree in secondary education from American University. Favorable media reports have characterized her as being "woke".

Career 
In 2014, while Packnett was the executive director of Teach for America in St. Louis, she became involved in the protests that erupted after a police officer shot and killed an 18-year-old black man, Michael Brown, in Ferguson, Missouri. She used Twitter and other social media to fight back against the distorted narrative the media was painting surrounding the protests. Packnett became a significant figure of Black Twitter, where she spoke out about education, voting rights, and equal pay.

The Washington Post described Packnett as "heavily involved in the planning and coordination of the Ferguson protest," and Missouri Governor Jay Nixon appointed her to serve on the Ferguson Commission established to respond to the unrest.

In the summer of 2015, MAYANN cofounded Campaign Zero, a policy platform designed to end police violence. That same year she was appointed to Barack Obama's Task Force on 21st Century Policing, which emerged at the height of the police violence crisis. Time magazine named Packnett to a 2015 list of "12 New Faces of Black Leadership." She was also named to The Root magazine's 2015 Root 100 list, wherein she was described as "the bridge over turbulent, troubled waters." Ebony cited Packnett with Johnetta Elzie, Deray Mckesson, and Samuel Sinyangwe to its 2015 Power 100 list for their work on Campaign Zero.

In 2016, she was promoted to Vice President of National Community Alliances at Teach for America and began the organization's first civil rights and equality campaign.

During the 2016 U.S. presidential election, Packnett endorsed Hillary Clinton for president, stating: "This is not about me. This is about the work. The best way I can use my platform is to support Secretary Clinton."

In a 2017 NPR interview, Packnett encouraged white people to use the essay White Privilege: Unpacking the Invisible Knapsack by Peggy McIntosh as a tool for recognizing and combating their white privilege.

During a May 2020 interview on MSNBC about the murder of Ahmaud Arbery, Packnett Cunningham said, "America needs to ask itself why only a viral consumption of black suffering can actually bring action."

During a Feb 2022 interview on MSNBC about new self-defense legislation proposed in her home state of Missouri, Packnett Cunningham said, "When folks talk about making America great again...They want to return to days when you could lynch or murder Black folks and there would be absolutely no retribution for it. That’s not hyperbole."

Personal life 
In 2019, Brittany Packnett married fellow activist Reginald Cunningham in New Orleans. The couple met in 2014 at a protest in their hometown of St. Louis. The couple was married at artist Brandan "Bmike" Odums' gallery, Studio BE, while standing between room-length portraits of Coretta Scott King and Martin Luther King Jr.

Stories of her ancestors were uncovered in an episode of PBS' Finding Your Roots, including the identity of her paternal grandfather, previously unknown to her.

References

External links
brittanypacknett.com, official website
 Appearance on Finding Your Roots January 11, 2022 

1984 births
Living people
Activists for African-American civil rights
Black Lives Matter people
Teach For America alumni
Washington University in St. Louis alumni
American University alumni
MSNBC people
Activists from St. Louis